Lies of the Heart: The Story of Laurie Kellogg is a 1994 American made-for-television crime drama film directed by Michael Toshiyuki Uno. The film is based on actual events and was received with mixed reviews. Variety was positive, claiming that the movie was told with 'great emotional depth'.

Plot 
When she was 16-years old, Laurie met and fell in love with an older man, 31-year old Bruce Kellogg. She soon moves in with him, and doesn't know that her stepfather actually sold her to him for $500. They are happy at first, but it soon becomes clear that he has an obsession with young girls. Naïve, Laurie doesn't notice anything, and does everything to please him. Bruce grows to become more violent, and sexually assaults her. Laurie eventually encourages her teenage friends to kill him. After the murder, she is charged with the killing of her husband. From thereon, it is up to her to prove that she was a victim of domestic violence.

Cast
Jennie Garth as Laurie Kellogg
Gregory Harrison as Bruce Kellogg
Steven Keats as Peter Orville
Francis Guinan as Dennis Bender
T.C. Warner as Nicole Pappas
Stephanie Sawyer as Young Nicole
Robin Frates as Marlene
Alexis Arquette as Denver McDowell
Sharon Spelman as Linda Francis
Jeff Doucette as Ed Francis
Virginya Keehne as Kristi Mullins
Gina Philips as Alicia
Heather Lauren Olson as Alicia (Age 6)
Phil Buckman as Chuck Sebelist
Haley Joel Osment as Kyle

References

External links

1994 television films
1994 films
1994 crime drama films
American crime drama films
Films about domestic violence
Crime films based on actual events
American drama television films
1990s English-language films
Films directed by Michael Toshiyuki Uno
1990s American films